Titiribí is a town and municipality in the Colombian department of Antioquia. Part of the subregion of Southwestern Antioquia.

References

Municipalities of Antioquia Department